The 1932 Boston College Eagles football team represented Boston College as an independent during the 1932 college football season. The Eagles were led by fifth-year head coach Joe McKenney and played their home games at Alumni Field in Chestnut Hill, Massachusetts. The team finished with a record of 4–2–2.

Schedule

References

Boston College
Boston College Eagles football seasons
Boston College Eagles football
1930s in Boston